Dimitrios Koutsoukis (born 8 December 1962) is a retired Greek shot putter who won a gold medal in the 1987 Mediterranean Games in Shot Put and represented Greece in 1984 Summer Olympic Games.

His personal best throw was 20.74 metres, achieved in July 1989 in Drama. This is the current Greek record.

Achievements

References

1962 births
Living people
Greek male shot putters
Athletes (track and field) at the 1984 Summer Olympics
Olympic athletes of Greece
PAOK athletes
Mediterranean Games gold medalists for Greece
Mediterranean Games bronze medalists for Greece
Athletes (track and field) at the 1987 Mediterranean Games
Athletes (track and field) at the 1993 Mediterranean Games
Mediterranean Games medalists in athletics
Athletes from Piraeus